The Boat Builders is an oil painting on panel by American landscape painter Winslow Homer, which is held in the collection of the Indianapolis Museum of Art (IMA), in Indianapolis, Indiana, United States.

Description

The Boat Builders depicts two young boys sitting on a rocky shoreline working on building toy boats. They both wear wide-brimmed hats, which shield their faces from the viewer. A blue sky in the background resides over the ocean, where a number of boats pass by the shore. The painting is on a mahogany panel and is signed on the lower left: "HOMER/1873"; by 1969 the date was no longer visible on the painting.

Context

In 1873 Homer spent his summer in Gloucester, Massachusetts, which is where he painted The Boat Builders, as well as other works in his series of drawings and paintings about shipbuilding. The connection of the boys' toy boats and the sailing ship was sought to intertwine the imagination of the boys with the real-life experience of fishermen. It is believed that the boys' hobby suggests their future role in the ship, sea and fishing industries.

Ownership and exhibition history

In the October 11, 1873 issue of Harper's Weekly the painting appeared as an engraving.

The artwork was acquired by the IMA with funds from the Martha Delzell Memorial Fund. The Boat Builders is currently on location at the IMA's Paine Turn of the Century American Art Gallery.

Notes

Bibliography

Indianapolis Museum of Art Bulletin. 5 (1969): 25. Indianapolis Museum of Art.

Further reading

Cikovsky Jr., Nicolai and Franklin Kelly. Winslow Homer, New Haven: Yale University Press, 1995. 
Day, Holliday T. Indianapolis Museum of Art Collections Handbook, Indianapolis: Indianapolis Museum of Art, 1988. 
Gerdts, Abigail Booth and Lloyd Goodrich. Winslow Homer in Monochrome, New York: Knoedler & Company, 1986. 
Goodrich, Lloyd. Winslow Homer, New York: New York Graphic Society, 1974. 
Griffin, Randall C. Winslow Homer: An American Vision, London: Phaidon Press, 2006. 

Paintings by Winslow Homer
1873 paintings
Ships in art
Paintings in the collection of the Indianapolis Museum of Art